The Spanish Civil War was a civil war in Spain fought from 1936 to 1939 between the Republicans and the Nationalists. Republicans were loyal to the left-leaning Popular Front government of the Second Spanish Republic, and consisted of various socialist, communist, separatist, anarchist, and republican parties, some of which had opposed the government in the pre-war period. The opposing Nationalists were an alliance of Falangists, monarchists, conservatives, and traditionalists led by a military junta among whom General Francisco Franco quickly achieved a preponderant role. Due to the international political climate at the time, the war had many facets and was variously viewed as class struggle, a religious struggle, a struggle between dictatorship and republican democracy, between revolution and counterrevolution, and between fascism and communism. According to Claude Bowers, U.S. ambassador to Spain during the war, it was the "dress rehearsal" for World War II. The Nationalists won the war, which ended in early 1939, and ruled Spain until Franco's death in November 1975.

The war began after the partial failure of the coup d'état of July 1936 against the Republican government by a group of generals of the Spanish Republican Armed Forces, with General Emilio Mola as the primary planner and leader and having General José Sanjurjo as a figurehead. The government at the time was a coalition of Republicans, supported in the Cortes by communist and socialist parties, under the leadership of centre-left President Manuel Azaña. The Nationalist group was supported by a number of conservative groups, including CEDA, monarchists, including both the opposing Alfonsists and the religious conservative Carlists, and the Falange Española de las JONS, a fascist political party. After the deaths of Sanjurjo, Emilio Mola and Manuel Goded Llopis, Franco emerged as the remaining leader of the Nationalist side.

The coup was supported by military units in Morocco, Pamplona, Burgos, Zaragoza, Valladolid, Cádiz, Córdoba, and Seville. However, rebelling units in almost all important cities—such as Madrid, Barcelona, Valencia, Bilbao, and Málaga—did not gain control, and those cities remained under the control of the government. This left Spain militarily and politically divided. The Nationalists and the Republican government fought for control of the country. The Nationalist forces received munitions, soldiers, and air support from Fascist Italy, Nazi Germany and Portugal, while the Republican side received support from the Soviet Union and Mexico. Other countries, such as the United Kingdom, France, and the United States, continued to recognise the Republican government but followed an official policy of non-intervention. Despite this policy, tens of thousands of citizens from non-interventionist countries directly participated in the conflict. They fought mostly in the pro-Republican International Brigades, which also included several thousand exiles from pro-Nationalist regimes.

The Nationalists advanced from their strongholds in the south and west, capturing most of Spain's northern coastline in 1937. They also besieged Madrid and the area to its south and west for much of the war. After much of Catalonia was captured in 1938 and 1939, and Madrid cut off from Barcelona, the Republican military position became hopeless. Following the fall without resistance of Barcelona in January 1939, the Francoist regime was recognised by France and the United Kingdom in February 1939. On 5 March 1939, in response to an alleged increasing communist dominance of the republican government and the deteriorating military situation, Colonel Segismundo Casado led a military coup against the Republican government, with the intention of seeking peace with the Nationalists. These peace overtures, however, were rejected by Franco. Following internal conflict between Republican factions in Madrid in the same month, Franco entered the capital and declared victory on 1 April 1939. Hundreds of thousands of Spaniards fled to refugee camps in southern France. Those associated with the losing Republicans who stayed were persecuted by the victorious Nationalists. Franco established a dictatorship in which all right-wing parties were fused into the structure of the Franco regime.

The war became notable for the passion and political division it inspired and for the many atrocities that occurred. Organised purges occurred in territory captured by Franco's forces so they could consolidate their future regime. Mass executions on a lesser scale also took place in areas controlled by the Republicans, with the participation of local authorities varying from location to location.

Background 

The 19th century was a turbulent time for Spain. Those in favour of reforming the Spanish government vied for political power with conservatives who intended to prevent such reforms from being implemented. In a tradition that started with the Spanish Constitution of 1812, many liberals sought to curtail the authority of the Spanish monarchy as well as to establish a nation-state under their ideology and philosophy. The reforms of 1812 were short-lived as they were almost immediately overturned by King Ferdinand VII when he dissolved the aforementioned constitution. This ended the Trienio Liberal government. Twelve successful coups were carried out between 1814 and 1874. There were several attempts to realign the political system to match social reality. Until the 1850s, the economy of Spain was primarily based on agriculture. There was little development of a bourgeois industrial or commercial class. The land-based oligarchy remained powerful; a small number of people held large estates called latifundia as well as all of the important positions in government. In addition to these regime changes and hierarchies, there was a series of civil wars that transpired in Spain known as the Carlist Wars throughout the middle of the century. There were three such wars: the First Carlist War (1833–1840), the Second Carlist War (1846–1849), and the Third Carlist War (1872–1876). During these wars, a right-wing political movement known as Carlism fought to institute a monarchial dynasty under a different branch of the House of Bourbon descended from Don Infante Carlos María Isidro of Molina.

In 1868, popular uprisings led to the overthrow of Queen Isabella II of the House of Bourbon. Two distinct factors led to the uprisings: a series of urban riots and a liberal movement within the middle classes and the military (led by General Joan Prim) concerned with the ultra-conservatism of the monarchy. In 1873, Isabella's replacement, King Amadeo I of the House of Savoy, abdicated due to increasing political pressure, and the short-lived First Spanish Republic was proclaimed. After the restoration of the Bourbons in December 1874, Carlists and anarchists emerged in opposition to the monarchy. Alejandro Lerroux, Spanish politician and leader of the Radical Republican Party, helped to bring republicanism to the fore in Catalonia—a region of Spain with its own cultural and societal identity in which poverty was particularly acute at the time. Conscription was a controversial policy that was eventually implemented by the government of Spain. As evidenced by the Tragic Week in 1909, resentment and resistance were factors that continued well into the 20th century.

Spain was neutral in World War I. Following the war, wide swathes of Spanish society, including the armed forces, united in hopes of removing the corrupt central government of the country in Madrid, but these circles were ultimately unsuccessful. Popular perception of communism as a major threat significantly increased during this period. In 1923, a military coup brought Miguel Primo de Rivera to power. As a result, Spain transitioned to government by military dictatorship. Support for the Rivera regime gradually faded, and he resigned in January 1930. He was replaced by General Dámaso Berenguer, who was in turn himself replaced by Admiral Juan Bautista Aznar-Cabañas; both men continued a policy of rule by decree. There was little support for the monarchy in the major cities. Consequently, much like Amadeo I nearly sixty years earlier, King Alfonso XIII of Spain relented to popular pressure for the establishment of a republic in 1931 and called municipal elections for 12 April of that year. Left-wing entities such as the socialist and liberal republicans won almost all the provincial capitals and, following the resignation of Aznar's government, Alfonso XIII fled the country. At this time, the Second Spanish Republic was formed. This republic remained in power until the culmination of the civil war five years later.

The revolutionary committee headed by Niceto Alcalá-Zamora became the provisional government, with Alcalá-Zamora himself as president and head of state. The republic had broad support from all segments of society. In May, an incident where a taxi driver was attacked outside a monarchist club sparked anti-clerical violence throughout Madrid and south-west portion of the country. The slow response on the part of the government disillusioned the right and reinforced their view that the Republic was determined to persecute the church. In June and July, the Confederación Nacional del Trabajo (CNT) called several strikes, which led to a violent incident between CNT members and the Civil Guard and a brutal crackdown by the Civil Guard and the army against the CNT in Seville. This led many workers to believe the Spanish Second Republic was just as oppressive as the monarchy, and the CNT announced its intention of overthrowing it via revolution. Elections in June 1931 returned a large majority of Republicans and Socialists. With the onset of the Great Depression, the government tried to assist rural Spain by instituting an eight-hour day and redistributing land tenure to farm workers. The rural workers lived in some of the worst poverty in Europe at the time and the government tried to increase their wages and improve working conditions. This estranged small and medium landholders who used hired labour. The Law of Municipal Boundaries forbade the hiring of workers from outside the locality of the owner's holdings. Since not all localities had enough labour for the tasks required, the law had unintended negative consequences, such as sometimes shutting out peasants and renters from the labour market when they needed extra income as pickers. Labour arbitration boards were set up to regulate salaries, contracts and working hours; they were more favourable to workers than employers and thus the latter became hostile to them. A decree in July 1931 increased overtime pay and several laws in late 1931 restricted whom landowners could hire. Other efforts included decrees limiting the use of machinery, efforts to create a monopoly on hiring, strikes and efforts by unions to limit women's employment to preserve a labour monopoly for their members. Class struggle intensified as landowners turned to counterrevolutionary organisations and local oligarchs. Strikes, workplace theft, arson, robbery and assaults on shops, strikebreakers, employers and machines became increasingly common. Ultimately, the reforms of the Republican-Socialist government alienated as many people as they pleased.

Republican Manuel Azaña Diaz became prime minister of a minority government in October 1931. Fascism remained a reactive threat and it was facilitated by controversial reforms to the military. In December, a new reformist, liberal, and democratic constitution was declared. It included strong provisions enforcing a broad secularisation of the Catholic country, which included the abolishing of Catholic schools and charities, which many moderate committed Catholics opposed. At this point once the constituent assembly had fulfilled its mandate of approving a new constitution, it should have arranged for regular parliamentary elections and adjourned. However fearing the increasing popular opposition, the Radical and Socialist majority postponed the regular elections, prolonging their time in power for two more years. Diaz's republican government initiated numerous reforms to, in their view, modernize the country. In 1932, the Jesuits who were in charge of the best schools throughout the country were banned and had all their property confiscated. The army was reduced. Landowners were expropriated. Home rule was granted to Catalonia, with a local parliament and a president of its own. In June 1933, Pope Pius XI issued the encyclical Dilectissima Nobis, "On Oppression of the Church of Spain", raising his voice against the persecution of the Catholic Church in Spain.

In November 1933, the right-wing parties won the general election. The causal factors were increased resentment of the incumbent government caused by a controversial decree implementing land reform and by the Casas Viejas incident, and the formation of a right-wing alliance, Spanish Confederation of Autonomous Right-wing Groups (CEDA). Another factor was the recent enfranchisement of women, most of whom voted for centre-right parties. The left Republicans attempted to have Niceto Alcalá Zamora cancel the electoral results but did not succeed. Despite CEDA's electoral victory, president Alcalá-Zamora declined to invite its leader, Gil Robles, to form a government fearing CEDA's monarchist sympathies and proposed changes to the constitution. Instead, he invited the Radical Republican Party's Alejandro Lerroux to do so. Despite receiving the most votes, CEDA was denied cabinet positions for nearly a year.

Events in the period after November 1933, called the "black biennium", seemed to make a civil war more likely. Alejandro Lerroux of the Radical Republican Party (RRP) formed a government, reversing changes made by the previous administration and granting amnesty to the collaborators of the unsuccessful uprising by General José Sanjurjo in August 1932. Some monarchists joined with the then fascist-nationalist Falange Española y de las JONS ("Falange") to help achieve their aims. Open violence occurred in the streets of Spanish cities, and militancy continued to increase, reflecting a movement towards radical upheaval, rather than peaceful democratic means as solutions. A small insurrection by anarchists occurred in December 1933 in response to CEDA's victory, in which around 100 people died. After a year of intense pressure, CEDA, the party with the most seats in parliament, finally succeeded in forcing the acceptance of three ministries. The Socialists (PSOE) and Communists reacted with an insurrection for which they had been preparing for nine months. The rebellion developed into a bloody revolutionary uprising, against the existing order. Fairly well armed revolutionaries managed to take the whole province of Asturias, murdered numerous policemen, clergymen, and civilians, and destroyed religious buildings including churches, convents, and part of the university at Oviedo. Rebels in the occupied areas proclaimed revolution for the workers and abolished existing currency. The rebellion was crushed in two weeks by the Spanish Navy and the Spanish Republican Army, the latter using mainly Moorish colonial troops from Spanish Morocco. Azaña was in Barcelona that day, and the Lerroux-CEDA government tried to implicate him. He was arrested and charged with complicity. In fact, Azaña had no connection with the rebellion and was released from prison in January 1935.

In sparking an uprising, the non-anarchist socialists, like the anarchists, manifested their conviction that the existing political order was illegitimate. The Spanish historian Salvador de Madariaga, an Azaña supporter and an exiled vocal opponent of Francisco Franco, wrote a sharp criticism of the left's participation in the revolt: "The uprising of 1934 is unforgivable. The argument that Mr Gil Robles tried to destroy the Constitution to establish fascism was, at once, hypocritical and false. With the rebellion of 1934, the Spanish left lost even the shadow of moral authority to condemn the rebellion of 1936."

Reversals of land reform resulted in expulsions, firings, and arbitrary changes to working conditions in the central and southern countryside in 1935, with landowners' behaviour at times reaching "genuine cruelty", with violence against farmworkers and socialists, which caused several deaths. One historian argued that the behaviour of the right in the southern countryside was one of the main causes of hatred during the Civil War and possibly even the Civil War itself. Landowners taunted workers by saying that if they went hungry, they should "Go eat the Republic!" Bosses fired leftist workers and imprisoned trade union and socialist militants, and wages were reduced to "salaries of hunger".

In 1935, the government led by the Radical Republican Party went through a series of crises. President Niceto Alcalá-Zamora, who was hostile to this government, called another election. The Popular Front narrowly won the 1936 general election. The revolutionary left-wing masses took to the streets and freed prisoners. In the thirty-six hours following the election, sixteen people were killed (mostly by police officers attempting to maintain order or to intervene in violent clashes) and thirty-nine were seriously injured. Also, fifty churches and seventy conservative political centres were attacked or set ablaze. Manuel Azaña Díaz was called to form a government before the electoral process had ended. He shortly replaced Zamora as president, taking advantage of a constitutional loophole. Convinced that the left was no longer willing to follow the rule of law and that its vision of Spain was under threat, the right abandoned the parliamentary option and began planning to overthrow the republic, rather than to control it.

PSOE's left wing socialists started to take action. Julio Álvarez del Vayo talked about "Spain' being converted into a socialist Republic in association with the Soviet Union". Francisco Largo Caballero declared that "the organized proletariat will carry everything before it and destroy everything until we reach our goal". The country rapidly descended into anarchy. Even the staunch socialist Indalecio Prieto, at a party rally in Cuenca in May 1936, complained: "we have never seen so tragic a panorama or so great a collapse as in Spain at this moment. Abroad, Spain is classified as insolvent. This is not the road to socialism or communism but to desperate anarchism without even the advantage of liberty". The disenchantment with Azaña's ruling was also voiced by Miguel de Unamuno, a republican and one of Spain's most respected intellectuals who, in June 1936, told a reporter who published his statement in El Adelanto that President Manuel Azaña should commit suicide "as a patriotic act".

According to Stanley Payne, by July 1936, the situation in Spain had deteriorated massively. Spanish commentators spoke of chaos and preparation for revolution, foreign diplomats prepared for the possibility of revolution, and an interest in fascism developed among the threatened. Payne states that, by July 1936:

Laia Balcells observes that polarisation in Spain just before the coup was so intense that physical confrontations between leftists and rightists were a routine occurrence in most localities; six days before the coup occurred, there was a riot between the two in the province of Teruel. Balcells notes that Spanish society was so divided along Left-Right lines that the monk Hilari Raguer stated that in his parish, instead of playing "cops and robbers", children would sometimes play "leftists and rightists". Within the first month of the Popular Front's government, nearly a quarter of the provincial governors had been removed due to their failure to prevent or control strikes, illegal land occupation, political violence and arson. The Popular Front government was more likely to persecute rightists for violence than leftists who committed similar acts. Azaña was hesitant to use the army to shoot or stop rioters or protestors as many of them supported his coalition. On the other hand, he was reluctant to disarm the military as he believed he needed them to stop insurrections from the extreme left. Illegal land occupation became widespread—poor tenant farmers knew the government was disinclined to stop them. By April 1936, nearly 100,000 peasants had appropriated 400,000 hectares of land and perhaps as many as 1 million hectares by the start of the civil war; for comparison, the 1931–33 land reform had granted only 6,000 peasants 45,000 hectares. As many strikes occurred between April and July as had occurred in the entirety of 1931. Workers increasingly demanded less work and more pay. "Social crimes"—refusing to pay for goods and rent—became increasingly common by workers, particularly in Madrid. In some cases this was done in the company of armed militants. Conservatives, the middle classes, businessmen and landowners became convinced that revolution had already begun.

Prime Minister Santiago Casares Quiroga ignored warnings of a military conspiracy involving several generals, who decided that the government had to be replaced to prevent the dissolution of Spain. Both sides had become convinced that, if the other side gained power, it would discriminate against their members and attempt to suppress their political organisations.

Military coup

Backgrounds 

Shortly after the Popular Front's victory in the 1936 election, various groups of officers, both active and retired, got together to begin discussing the prospect of a coup. It would only be by the end of April that General Emilio Mola would emerge as the leader of a national conspiracy network. The Republican government acted to remove suspect generals from influential posts. Franco was sacked as chief of staff and transferred to command of the Canary Islands. Manuel Goded Llopis was removed as inspector general and was made general of the Balearic Islands. Emilio Mola was moved from head of the Army of Africa to military commander of Pamplona in Navarre. This, however, allowed Mola to direct the mainland uprising. General José Sanjurjo became the figurehead of the operation and helped reach an agreement with the Carlists. Mola was chief planner and second in command. José Antonio Primo de Rivera was put in prison in mid-March in order to restrict the Falange. However, government actions were not as thorough as they might have been, and warnings by the Director of Security and other figures were not acted upon.

The revolt was devoid of any particular ideology. The major goal was to put an end to anarchical disorder. Mola's plan for the new regime was envisioned as a "republican dictatorship", modelled after Salazar's Portugal and as a semi-pluralist authoritarian regime rather than a totalitarian fascist dictatorship. The initial government would be an all-military "Directory", which would create a "strong and disciplined state". General Sanjurjo would be the head of this new regime, due to being widely liked and respected within the military, though his position would be largely symbolic due to his lack of political talent. The 1931 Constitution would be suspended, replaced by a new "constituent parliament" which would be chosen by a new politically purged electorate, who would vote on the issue of republic versus monarchy. Certain liberal elements would remain, such as separation of church and state as well as freedom of religion. Agrarian issues would be solved by regional commissioners on the basis of smallholdings but collective cultivation would be permitted in some circumstances. Legislation prior to February 1936 would be respected. Violence would be required to destroy opposition to the coup, though it seems Mola did not envision the mass atrocities and repression that would ultimately manifest during the civil war. Of particular importance to Mola was ensuring the revolt was at its core an Army affair, one that would not be subject to special interests and that the coup would make the armed forces the basis for the new state. However, the separation of church and state was forgotten once the conflict assumed the dimension of a war of religion, and military authorities increasingly deferred to the Church and to the expression of Catholic sentiment. However, Mola's program was vague and only a rough sketch, and there were disagreements among coupists about their vision for Spain.

On 12 June, Prime Minister Casares Quiroga met General Juan Yagüe, who falsely convinced Casares of his loyalty to the republic. Mola began serious planning in the spring. Franco was a key player because of his prestige as a former director of the military academy and as the man who suppressed the Asturian miners' strike of 1934. He was respected in the Army of Africa, the Army's toughest troops. He wrote a cryptic letter to Casares on 23 June, suggesting that the military was disloyal, but could be restrained if he were put in charge. Casares did nothing, failing to arrest or buy off Franco. With the help of the British intelligence agents Cecil Bebb and Hugh Pollard, the rebels chartered a Dragon Rapide aircraft (paid for with help from Juan March, the wealthiest man in Spain at the time) to transport Franco from the Canary Islands to Spanish Morocco. The plane flew to the Canaries on 11 July, and Franco arrived in Morocco on 19 July. According to Stanley Payne, Franco was offered this position as Mola's planning for the coup had become increasingly complex and it did not look like it would be as swift as he hoped, instead likely turning into a miniature civil war that would last several weeks. Mola thus had concluded that the troops in Spain were insufficient for the task and that it would be necessary to use elite units from North Africa, something which Franco had always believed would be necessary.

On 12 July 1936, Falangists in Madrid killed police officer Lieutenant José Castillo of the Guardia de Asalto (Assault Guard). Castillo was a Socialist party member who, among other activities, was giving military training to the UGT youth. Castillo had led the Assault Guards that violently suppressed the riots after the funeral of Guardia Civil lieutenant Anastasio de los Reyes. (Los Reyes had been shot by anarchists during 14 April military parade commemorating the five years of the Republic.)

Assault Guard Captain Fernando Condés was a close personal friend of Castillo. The next day, after getting the approval of the minister of interior to illegally arrest specified members of parliament, he led his squad to arrest José María Gil-Robles y Quiñones, founder of CEDA, as a reprisal for Castillo's murder. But he was not at home, so they went to the house of José Calvo Sotelo, a leading Spanish monarchist and a prominent parliamentary conservative. Luis Cuenca, a member of the arresting group and a Socialist who was known as the bodyguard of PSOE leader Indalecio Prieto, summarily executed Calvo Sotelo by shooting him in the back of the neck. Hugh Thomas concludes that Condés intended to arrest Sotelo, and that Cuenca acted on his own initiative, although he acknowledges other sources dispute this finding.

Massive reprisals followed. The killing of Calvo Sotelo with police involvement aroused suspicions and strong reactions among the government's opponents on the right. Although the nationalist generals were already planning an uprising, the event was a catalyst and a public justification for a coup. Stanley Payne claims that before these events, the idea of rebellion by army officers against the government had weakened; Mola had estimated that only 12% of officers reliably supported the coup and at one point considered fleeing the country for fear he was already compromised, and had to be convinced to remain by his co-conspirators. However, the kidnapping and murder of Sotelo transformed the "limping conspiracy" into a revolt that could trigger a civil war. The arbitrary use of lethal force by the state and a lack of action against the attackers led to public disapproval of the government. No effective punitive, judicial or even investigative action was taken; Payne points to a possible veto by socialists within the government who shielded the killers who had been drawn from their ranks. The murder of a parliamentary leader by state police was unprecedented, and the belief that the state had ceased to be neutral and effective in its duties encouraged important sectors of the right to join the rebellion. Within hours of learning of the murder and the reaction, Franco changed his mind on rebellion and dispatched a message to Mola to display his firm commitment.

The Socialists and Communists, led by Indalecio Prieto, demanded that arms be distributed to the people before the military took over. The prime minister was hesitant.

Beginning of the coup 

The uprising's timing was fixed at 17 July, at 17:01, agreed to by the leader of the Carlists, Manuel Fal Conde. However, the timing was changed—the men in the Morocco protectorate were to rise up at 05:00 on 18 July and those in Spain proper a day later so that control of Spanish Morocco could be achieved and forces sent back to the Iberian Peninsula to coincide with the risings there. The rising was intended to be a swift coup d'état, but the government retained control of most of the country.

Control over Spanish Morocco was all but certain. The plan was discovered in Morocco on 17 July, which prompted the conspirators to enact it immediately. Little resistance was encountered. The rebels shot 189 people. Goded and Franco immediately took control of the islands to which they were assigned. On 18 July, Casares Quiroga refused an offer of help from the CNT and Unión General de Trabajadores (UGT), leading the groups to proclaim a general strike—in effect, mobilising. They opened weapons caches, some buried since the 1934 risings, and formed militias. The paramilitary security forces often waited for the outcome of militia action before either joining or suppressing the rebellion. Quick action by either the rebels or anarchist militias was often enough to decide the fate of a town. General Gonzalo Queipo de Llano secured Seville for the rebels, arresting a number of other officers.

Outcome 

The rebels failed to take any major cities with the critical exception of Seville, which provided a landing point for Franco's African troops, and the primarily conservative and Catholic areas of Old Castile and León, which fell quickly. They took Cádiz with help from the first troops from Africa.

The government retained control of Málaga, Jaén, and Almería. In Madrid, the rebels were hemmed into the Cuartel de la Montaña siege, which fell with considerable bloodshed. Republican leader Casares Quiroga was replaced by José Giral, who ordered the distribution of weapons among the civilian population. This facilitated the defeat of the army insurrection in the main industrial centres, including Madrid, Barcelona, and Valencia, but it allowed anarchists to take control of Barcelona along with large swathes of Aragón and Catalonia. General Goded surrendered in Barcelona and was later condemned to death. The Republican government ended up controlling almost all the east coast and central area around Madrid, as well as most of Asturias, Cantabria and part of the Basque Country in the north.

Hugh Thomas suggested that the civil war could have ended in the favour of either side almost immediately if certain decisions had been taken during the initial coup. Thomas argues that if the government had taken steps to arm the workers, they could probably have crushed the coup very quickly. Conversely, if the coup had risen everywhere in Spain on the 18th rather than be delayed, it could have triumphed by the 22nd. While the militias that rose to meet the rebels were often untrained and poorly armed (possessing only a small number of pistols, shotguns and dynamite), this was offset by the fact that the rebellion was not universal. In addition, the Falangists and Carlists were themselves often not particularly powerful fighters either. However, enough officers and soldiers had joined the coup to prevent it from being crushed swiftly.

The rebels termed themselves Nacionales, normally translated "Nationalists", although the former implies "true Spaniards" rather than a nationalistic cause. The result of the coup was a nationalist area of control containing 11 million of Spain's population of 25 million. The Nationalists had secured the support of around half of Spain's territorial army, some 60,000 men, joined by the Army of Africa, made up of 35,000 men, and just under half of Spain's militaristic police forces, the Assault Guards, the Civil Guards, and the Carabineers. Republicans controlled under half of the rifles and about a third of both machine guns and artillery pieces.

The Spanish Republican Army had just 18 tanks of a sufficiently modern design, and the Nationalists took control of 10. Naval capacity was uneven, with the Republicans retaining a numerical advantage, but with the Navy's top commanders and two of the most modern ships, heavy cruisers Canarias—captured at the Ferrol shipyard—and Baleares, in Nationalist control. The Spanish Republican Navy suffered from the same problems as the army—many officers had defected or been killed after trying to do so. Two-thirds of air capability was retained by the government—however, the whole of the Republican Air Force was very outdated.

Combatants 

The war was cast by Republican sympathisers as a struggle between tyranny and freedom, and by Nationalist supporters as communist and anarchist red hordes versus Christian civilisation. Nationalists also claimed they were bringing security and direction to an ungoverned and lawless country. Spanish politics, especially on the left, was quite fragmented: on the one hand socialists and communists supported the republic but on the other, during the republic, anarchists had mixed opinions, though both major groups opposed the Nationalists during the Civil War; the latter, in contrast, were united by their fervent opposition to the Republican government and presented a more unified front.

The coup divided the armed forces fairly evenly. One historical estimate suggests that there were some 87,000 troops loyal to the government and some 77,000 joining the insurgency, though some historians suggest that the Nationalist figure should be revised upwards and that it probably amounted to some 95,000.

During the first few months, both armies were joined in high numbers by volunteers, Nationalists by some 100,000 men and Republicans by some 120,000. From August, both sides launched their own, similarly scaled conscription schemes, resulting in further massive growth of their armies. Finally, the final months of 1936 saw the arrival of foreign troops, International Brigades joining the Republicans and Italian Corpo Truppe Volontarie (CTV), German Legion Condor and Portuguese Viriatos joining the Nationalists. The result was that in April 1937 there were some 360,000 soldiers in the Republican ranks and some 290,000 in the Nationalist ones.

The armies kept growing. The principal source of manpower was conscription; both sides continued and expanded their schemes, the Nationalists drafting more aggressively, and there was little room left for volunteering. Foreigners contributed little to further growth; on the Nationalist side the Italians scaled down their engagement, while on the Republican side the influx of new interbrigadistas did not cover losses on the front. At the turn of 1937–1938, each army numbered about 700,000.

Throughout 1938, the principal if not exclusive source of new men was a draft; at this stage it was the Republicans who conscripted more aggressively, and only 47% of their combatants were in age corresponding to the Nationalist conscription age limits. Just prior to the Battle of Ebro, Republicans achieved their all-time high, slightly above 800,000; yet Nationalists numbered 880,000. The Battle of Ebro, fall of Catalonia and collapsing discipline caused a great shrinking of Republican troops. In late February 1939, their army was 400,000 compared to more than double that number of Nationalists. In the moment of their final victory, Nationalists commanded over 900,000 troops.

The total number of Spaniards serving in the Republican forces was officially stated as 917,000; later scholarly work estimated the number as "well over 1 million men", though earlier studies claimed a Republican total of 1.75 million (including non-Spaniards). The total number of Spaniards serving in the Nationalist units is estimated at "nearly 1 million men", though earlier works claimed a total of 1.26 million Nationalists (including non-Spaniards).

Republicans 

Only two countries openly and fully supported the Republic: the Mexican government and the USSR. From them, especially the USSR, the Republic received diplomatic support, volunteers, weapons and vehicles. Other countries remained neutral; this neutrality faced serious opposition from sympathizers in the United States and United Kingdom, and to a lesser extent in other European countries and from Marxists worldwide. This led to formation of the International Brigades, thousands of foreigners of all nationalities who voluntarily went to Spain to aid the Republic in the fight; they meant a great deal to morale but militarily were not very significant.

The Republic's supporters within Spain ranged from centrists who supported a moderately-capitalist liberal democracy to revolutionary anarchists who opposed the Republic but sided with it against the coup forces. Their base was primarily secular and urban but also included landless peasants and was particularly strong in industrial regions like Asturias, the Basque country, and Catalonia.

This faction was called variously leales "Loyalists" by supporters, "Republicans", the "Popular Front", or "the government" by all parties; and/or los rojos "the Reds" by their opponents. Republicans were supported by urban workers, agricultural labourers, and parts of the middle class.

The conservative, strongly Catholic Basque country, along with Catholic Galicia and the more left-leaning Catalonia, sought autonomy or independence from the central government of Madrid. The Republican government allowed for the possibility of self-government for the two regions, whose forces were gathered under the People's Republican Army (Ejército Popular Republicano, or EPR), which was reorganised into mixed brigades after October 1936.

A few well-known people fought on the Republican side, such as English novelist George Orwell (who wrote Homage to Catalonia (1938), an account of his experiences in the war) and Canadian thoracic surgeon Norman Bethune, who developed a mobile blood-transfusion service for front-line operations. Simone Weil briefly fought with the anarchist columns of Buenaventura Durruti.

At the beginning of the war, the Republicans outnumbered the Nationalist ten to one, but by January 1937, that advantage had dropped to four to one.

Nationalists 

The Nacionales or Nationalists, also called "insurgents", "rebels" or, by opponents, Franquistas or "fascists" —feared national fragmentation and opposed the separatist movements. They were chiefly defined by their anti-communism, which galvanised diverse or opposed movements like Falangists and monarchists. Their leaders had a generally wealthier, more conservative, monarchist, landowning background.

The Nationalist side included the Carlists and Alfonsists, Spanish nationalists, the fascist Falange, and most conservatives and monarchist liberals. Virtually all Nationalist groups had strong Catholic convictions and supported the native Spanish clergy. The Nationals included the majority of the Catholic clergy and practitioners (outside of the Basque region), important elements of the army, most large landowners, and many businessmen. The Nationalist base largely consisted of the middle classes, conservative peasant smallholders in the North and Catholics in general. Catholic support became particularly pronounced as a consequence of the burning of churches and killing of priests in most leftists zones during the first six months of the war. By mid-1937, the Catholic Church gave its official blessing to the Franco regime; religious fervor was a major source of emotional support for the Nationalists during the civil war. Michael Seidmann reports that devout Catholics, such as seminary students, often volunteered to fight and would die in disproportionate numbers in the war. Catholic confession cleared the soldiers of moral doubt and increased fighting ability; Republican newspapers described Nationalist priests as ferocious in battle and Indalecio Prieto remarked that the enemy he feared most was "the requeté who has just received communion".

One of the rightists' principal motives was to confront the anti-clericalism of the Republican regime and to defend the Catholic Church, which had been targeted by opponents, including Republicans, who blamed the institution for the country's ills. The Church opposed many of the Republicans' reforms, which were fortified by the Spanish Constitution of 1931. Articles 24 and 26 of the 1931 constitution had banned the Society of Jesus. This proscription deeply offended many within the conservative fold. The revolution in the Republican zone at the outset of the war, in which 7,000 clergy and thousands of lay people were killed, deepened Catholic support for the Nationalists.

Prior to the war, during the Asturian miners' strike of 1934, religious buildings were burnt and at least 100 clergy, religious civilians, and pro-Catholic police were killed by revolutionaries. Franco had brought in Spain's colonial Army of Africa ( or ) and reduced the miners to submission by heavy artillery attacks and bombing raids. The Spanish Legion committed atrocities and the army carried out summary executions of leftists. The repression in the aftermath was brutal and prisoners were tortured.

The Moroccan Fuerzas Regulares Indígenas joined the rebellion and played a significant role in the civil war.

While the Nationalists are often assumed to have drawn in the majority of military officers, this is a somewhat simplistic analysis. The Spanish army had its own internal divisions and long-standing rifts. Officers supporting the coup tended to be africanistas (men who fought in North Africa between 1909 and 1923) while those who stayed loyal tended to be peninsulares (men who stayed back in Spain during this period). This was because during Spain's North African campaigns, the traditional promotion by seniority was suspended in favour of promotion by merit through battlefield heroism. This tended to benefit younger officers starting their careers as they could, while older officers had familial commitments that made it harder for them to be deployed in North Africa. Officers in front line combat corps (primarily infantry and cavalry) benefited over those in technical corps (those in artillery, engineering etc.) because they had more chances to demonstrate the requisite battlefield heroism and had also traditionally enjoyed promotion by seniority. The peninsulares resented seeing the africanistas rapidly leapfrog through the ranks, while the africanistas themselves were seen as swaggering and arrogant, further fuelling resentment. Thus, when the coup occurred, officers who joined the rebellion, particularly from Franco's rank downwards, were often africanistas, while senior officers and those in non-front line positions tended to oppose it (though a small number of senior africanistas opposed the coup as well). It has also been argued that officers who stayed loyal to the Republic were more likely to have been promoted and to have been favoured by the Republican regime (such as those in the Aviation and Assault Guard units). Thus, while often thought of as a "rebellion of the generals", this is not correct. Of the eighteen division generals, only four rebelled (of the four division generals without postings, two rebelled and two remained loyal). Fourteen of the fifty-six brigade generals rebelled. The rebels tended to draw from less senior officers. Of the approximately 15,301 officers, just over half rebelled.

Other factions 
Catalan and Basque nationalists were divided. Left-wing Catalan nationalists sided with the Republicans, while Conservative Catalan nationalists were far less vocal in supporting the government, due to anti-clericalism and confiscations occurring in areas within its control. Basque nationalists, heralded by the conservative Basque Nationalist Party, were mildly supportive of the Republican government, although some in Navarre sided with the uprising for the same reasons influencing conservative Catalans. Notwithstanding religious matters, Basque nationalists, who were for the most part Catholic, generally sided with the Republicans, although the PNV, Basque nationalist party, was reported passing the plans of Bilbao defences to the Nationalists, in an attempt to reduce the duration and casualties of siege.

Foreign involvement 

The Spanish Civil War exposed political divisions across Europe. The right and the Catholics supported the Nationalists to stop the spread of Bolshevism. On the left, including labour unions, students and intellectuals, the war represented a necessary battle to stop the spread of fascism. Anti-war and pacifist sentiment was strong in many countries, leading to warnings that the Civil War could escalate into a second world war. In this respect, the war was an indicator of the growing instability across Europe.

The Spanish Civil War involved large numbers of non-Spanish citizens who participated in combat and advisory positions. Britain and France led a political alliance of 27 nations that pledged non-intervention, including an embargo on all arms exports to Spain. The United States unofficially adopted a position of non-intervention as well, despite abstaining from joining the alliance (due in part to its policy of political isolation). Germany, Italy and the Soviet Union signed on officially, but ignored the embargo. The attempted suppression of imported material was largely ineffective, and France was especially accused of allowing large shipments to Republican troops. The clandestine actions of the various European powers were, at the time, considered to be risking another world war, alarming antiwar elements across the world.

The League of Nations' reaction to the war was influenced by a fear of communism, and was insufficient to contain the massive importation of arms and other war resources by the fighting factions. Although a Non-Intervention Committee was formed, its policies accomplished little and its directives were ineffective.

Support for the Nationalists

Italy 

As the conquest of Ethiopia in the Second Italo-Ethiopian War made the Italian government confident in its military power, Benito Mussolini joined the war to secure Fascist control of the Mediterranean, supporting the Nationalists to a greater extent than the National-Socialists did. The Royal Italian Navy played a substantial role in the Mediterranean blockade, and ultimately Italy supplied machine guns, artillery, aircraft, tankettes, the Aviazione Legionaria, and the Corpo Truppe Volontarie (CTV) to the Nationalist cause. The Italian CTV would, at its peak, supply the Nationalists with 50,000 men. Italian warships took part in breaking the Republican navy's blockade of Nationalist-held Spanish Morocco and took part in naval bombardment of Republican-held Málaga, Valencia, and Barcelona. In total, Italy provided the Nationalists with 660 planes, 150 tanks, 800 artillery pieces, 10,000 machine guns, and 240,747 rifles.

Germany 

German involvement began days after fighting broke out in July 1936. Adolf Hitler quickly sent in powerful air and armoured units to assist the Nationalists. The war provided combat experience with the latest technology for the German military. However, the intervention also posed the risk of escalating into a world war for which Hitler was not ready. Therefore, he limited his aid, and instead encouraged Benito Mussolini to send in large Italian units.

Nazi Germany's actions included the formation of the multitasking Condor Legion, a unit composed of volunteers from the Luftwaffe and the German Army (Heer) from July 1936 to March 1939. The Condor Legion proved to be especially useful in the 1936 battle of the Toledo. Germany moved the Army of Africa to mainland Spain in the war's early stages. German operations slowly expanded to include strike targets, most notably—and controversially—the bombing of Guernica which, on 26 April 1937, killed 200 to 300 civilians. Germany also used the war to test new weapons, such as the Luftwaffe Junkers Ju 87 Stukas and Junkers Ju-52 transport Trimotors (used also as Bombers), which showed themselves to be effective.

German involvement was further manifested through undertakings such as Operation Ursula, a U-boat undertaking; and contributions from the Kriegsmarine. The Legion spearheaded many Nationalist victories, particularly in aerial combat, while Spain further provided a proving ground for German tank tactics. The training which German units provided to the Nationalist forces would prove valuable. By the War's end, perhaps 56,000 Nationalist soldiers, encompassing infantry, artillery, aerial and naval forces, had been trained by German detachments.

Hitler's policy for Spain was shrewd and pragmatic. The minutes of a conference at the Reich Chancellery in Berlin on 10 November 1937 summarised his views on foreign policy regarding the Spanish Civil War: "On the other hand, a 100 percent victory for Franco was not desirable either, from the German point of view; rather were we interested in a continuance of the war and in the keeping up of the tension in the Mediterranean." Hitler wanted to help Franco just enough to gain his gratitude and to prevent the side supported by the Soviet Union from winning, but not large enough to give the Caudillo a quick victory.

A total of approximately 16,000 German citizens fought in the war, with approximately 300 killed, though no more than 10,000 participated at any one time. German aid to the Nationalists amounted to approximately £43,000,000 ($215,000,000) in 1939 prices, 15.5% of which was used for salaries and expenses and 21.9% for direct delivery of supplies to Spain, while 62.6% was expended on the Condor Legion. In total, Germany provided the Nationalists with 600 planes and 200 tanks.

Portugal 

The Estado Novo regime of Portuguese Prime Minister António de Oliveira Salazar played an important role in supplying Franco's forces with ammunition and logistical help.

Salazar supported Francisco Franco and the Nationalists in their war against the Second Republic forces, as well as the anarchists and the communists. While the Nationalists lacked access to seaports early on, they secured control of the entire border with Portugal by the end of August 1936, thus giving Salazar and his regime a free hand to render whatever assistance to Franco they saw fit without fear of Republican interference or retaliation. Salazar's Portugal helped the Nationalist side receive armaments shipments from abroad, including ordnance when certain Nationalist forces virtually ran out of ammunition. Consequently, the Nationalists called Lisbon "the port of Castile". Later, Franco spoke of Salazar in glowing terms in an interview in the Le Figaro newspaper: "The most complete statesman, the one most worthy of respect, that I have known is Salazar. I regard him as an extraordinary personality for his intelligence, his political sense and his humility. His only defect is probably his modesty."

On 8 September 1936, a naval revolt took place in Lisbon. The crews of two naval Portuguese vessels, the NRP Afonso de Albuquerque and the NRP Dão, mutinied. The sailors, who were affiliated with the Portuguese Communist Party, confined their officers and attempted to sail the ships out of Lisbon to join the Spanish Republican forces fighting in Spain. Salazar ordered the ships to be destroyed by gunfire.

In January 1938, Salazar appointed Pedro Teotónio Pereira as special liaison of the Portuguese government to Franco's government, where he achieved great prestige and influence. In April 1938, Pereira officially became a full-rank Portuguese ambassador to Spain, remaining in this post throughout World War II.

Just a few days before the end of the Spanish Civil War, on 17 March 1939, Portugal and Spain signed the Iberian Pact, a non-aggression treaty that marked the beginning of a new phase in Iberian relations. Meetings between Franco and Salazar played a fundamental role in this new political arrangement. The pact proved to be a decisive instrument in keeping the Iberian Peninsula out of Hitler's continental system.

Despite its discreet direct military involvement—restrained to a somewhat "semi-official" endorsement, by its authoritarian regime—a "Viriatos Legion" volunteer force was organised, but disbanded, due to political unrest. Between 8,000 and 12,000 would-be legionaries did still volunteer, only now as part of various Nationalist units instead of a unified force. Due to the widespread publicity given to the Viriatos Legion previously, these Portuguese volunteers were still called "Viriatos". Portugal was instrumental in providing the Nationalists with organizational skills and reassurance from the Iberian neighbour to Franco and his allies that no interference would hinder the supply traffic directed to the Nationalist cause.

Others 
The Conservative government of Britain maintained a position of strong neutrality and was supported by British elite and the media, while the left mobilized aid to the Republicans. The government refused to allow arms shipments and sent warships to try to stop shipments. It was theoretically a crime to volunteer to fight in Spain, but about 4,000 went anyway. Intellectuals strongly favoured the Republicans. Many visited Spain, hoping to find authentic anti-fascism in practise. They had little impact on the government, and could not shake the strong public mood for peace. The Labour Party was split, with its Catholic element favouring the Nationalists. It officially endorsed the boycott and expelled a faction that demanded support for the Republican cause; but it finally voiced some support to Loyalists.

Romanian volunteers were led by Ion Moța, deputy-leader of the Iron Guard ("Legion of the Archangel Michael"), whose group of Seven Legionaries visited Spain in December 1936 to ally their movement with the Nationalists.

Despite the Irish government's prohibition against participating in the war, about 600 Irishmen, followers of the Irish political activist and co-founder of the recently created political party of Fine Gael (unofficially called "The Blue Shirts"), Eoin O'Duffy, known as the "Irish Brigade", went to Spain to fight alongside Franco. The majority of the volunteers were Catholics, and according to O'Duffy had volunteered to help the Nationalists fight against communism.

According to Spanish statistics, 1,052 Yugoslavs were recorded as volunteers of which 48% were Croats, 23% Slovenes, 18% Serbs, 2.3% Montenegrins and 1.5% Macedonians.

Support for the Republicans

International Brigades 

On 26 July, just eight days after the revolt had started, an international communist conference was held at Prague to arrange plans to help the Republican Government. It decided to raise an international brigade of 5,000 men and a fund of 1 billion francs. At the same time communist parties throughout the world quickly launched a full scale propaganda campaign in support of the Popular Front. The Communist International immediately reinforced its activity sending to Spain its leader Georgi Dimitrov, and Palmiro Togliatti the chief of the Communist Party of Italy. From August onward aid started to be sent from Russia, over one ship per day arrived at Spain's Mediterranean ports carrying munitions, rifles, machine guns, hand grenades, artillery and trucks. With the cargo came Soviet agents, technicians, instructors and propagandists.

The Communist International immediately started to organize the International Brigades with great care to conceal or minimize the communist character of the enterprise and to make it appear as a campaign on behalf of progressive democracy. Attractive names were deliberately chosen, such as Garibaldi Battalion in Italy, the Canadian "Mackenzie-Papineau Battalion" or Abraham Lincoln Battalion in the United States.

Many non-Spaniards, often affiliated with radical communist or socialist entities, joined the International Brigades, believing that the Spanish Republic was a front line in the war against fascism. The units represented the largest foreign contingent of those fighting for the Republicans. Roughly 40,000 foreign nationals fought with the Brigades, though no more than 18,000 were in the conflict at any given time. They claimed to represent 53 nations.

Significant numbers of volunteers came from France (10,000), Nazi Germany and Austria (5,000), and Italy (3,350). More than 1000 each came from the Soviet Union, the United States, the United Kingdom, Poland, Yugoslavia, Czechoslovakia, Hungary and Canada. The Thälmann Battalion, a group of Germans, and the Garibaldi Battalion, a group of Italians, distinguished their units during the siege of Madrid. Americans fought in units such as the XV International Brigade ("Abraham Lincoln Brigade"), while Canadians joined the Mackenzie–Papineau Battalion.

More than 500 Romanians fought on the Republican side, including Romanian Communist Party members Petre Borilă and Valter Roman. About 145 men from Ireland formed the Connolly Column, which was immortalized by Irish folk musician Christy Moore in the song "Viva la Quinta Brigada". Some Chinese joined the Brigades; the majority of them eventually returned to China, but some went to prison or to French refugee camps, and a handful remained in Spain.

Soviet Union 

Although General Secretary Joseph Stalin had signed the Non-Intervention Agreement, the Soviet Union contravened the League of Nations embargo by providing material assistance to the Republican forces, becoming their only source of major weapons. Unlike Hitler and Mussolini, Stalin tried to do this covertly. Estimates of material provided by the USSR to the Republicans vary between 634 and 806 aircraft, 331 and 362 tanks and 1,034 to 1,895 artillery pieces. Stalin also created Section X of the Soviet Union military to head the weapons shipment operation, called Operation X. Despite Stalin's interest in aiding the Republicans, the quality of arms was inconsistent. Many rifles and field guns provided were old, obsolete or otherwise of limited use (some dated back to the 1860s) but the T-26 and BT-5 tanks were modern and effective in combat. The Soviet Union supplied aircraft that were in current service with their own forces but the aircraft provided by Germany to the Nationalists proved superior by the end of the war.

The movement of arms from Russia to Spain was extremely slow. Many shipments were lost or arrived only partially matching what had been authorised. Stalin ordered shipbuilders to include false decks in the design of ships and while at sea, Soviet captains used deceptive flags and paint schemes to evade detection by the Nationalists.

The USSR sent 2,000–3,000 military advisers to Spain; while the Soviet commitment of troops was fewer than 500 men at a time, Soviet volunteers often operated Soviet-made tanks and aircraft, particularly at the beginning of the war. The Spanish commander of every military unit on the Republican side was attended by a "Comissar Politico" of equal rank, who represented Moscow.

The Republic paid for Soviet arms with official Bank of Spain gold reserves, 176 tonnes of which was transferred through France and 510 directly to Russia, which was called Moscow gold.

Also, the Soviet Union directed Communist parties around the world to organise and recruit the International Brigades.

Another significant Soviet involvement was the activity of the People's Commissariat for Internal Affairs (NKVD) inside the Republican rearguard. Communist figures including Vittorio Vidali ("Comandante Contreras"), Iosif Grigulevich, Mikhail Koltsov and, most prominently, Aleksandr Mikhailovich Orlov led operations that included the murders of Catalan anti-Stalinist Communist politician Andrés Nin, the socialist journalist Mark Rein, and the independent left-wing activist José Robles.

Other NKVD-led operations were the murder of the Austrian member of the International Left Opposition and Trotskyist Kurt Landau, and the shooting down (in December 1936) of the French aircraft in which the delegate of the International Committee of the Red Cross (ICRC), Georges Henny, carried extensive documentation on the Paracuellos massacres to France.

In his book, Partners in Crime: Faustian Bargain, historian Ian Ona Johnson explains that in the 1920s and 30s (during the Spanish Civil War) Germany and Soviet Russia had entered into a partnership centering on economic and military cooperation. This led to the establishment of German military bases and facilities in Russia. Neither country worried about adhering to the terms of the Versailles Treaty. The Nazi planes that bombed Republican cities and towns like Guernica, killing thousand of innocent civilians, were all made possible by Soviet Russia and the Communist Party leadership. This military exchange of war material continued until June 1941, when Germany invaded Stalin's Russia.

Poland

Polish arms sales to Republican Spain took place between September 1936 and February 1939. Politically Poland did not support any of the Spanish Civil War sides, though over time the Warsaw government increasingly tended to favour the Nationalists; sales to the Republicans were motivated exclusively by economic interest. Since Poland was bound by non-intervention obligations, Polish governmental officials and the military disguised sales as commercial transactions mediated by international brokers and targeting customers in various countries, principally in Latin America; there are 54 shipments from Danzig and Gdynia identified. Most hardware were obsolete and worn-out second-rate weapons, though there were also some modern arms delivered; all were 20–30% overpriced. Polish sales amounted to $40m and constituted some 5–7% of overall Republican military spendings, though in terms of quantity certain categories of weaponry, like machine-guns, might have accounted for 50% of all arms delivered. After the USSR Poland was the second largest arms supplier for the Republic. After the USSR, Italy and Germany, Poland was the 4th largest arms supplier to the war-engulfed Spain.

Greece

Greece maintained formal diplomatic relations with the Republic, though the Metaxas dictatorship sympathized with the Nationalists. The country joined the non-intervention policy in August 1936, yet from the onset the Athens government connived at arms sales to both sides. The official vendor was Pyrkal or Greek Powder and Cartridge Company (GPCC), and the key personality behind the deal was the GPCC head, Prodromos Bodosakis-Athanasiadis. The company partially took advantage of the earlier Schacht Plan, a German-Greek credit agreement which enabled Greek purchases from Rheinmetall-Borsig; some of German products were later re-exported to Republican Spain. However, GPCC was selling its own arms, as the company operated a number of factories, and partially thanks to Spanish sales it became the largest company in Greece.

Most of Greek sales went to the Republic; on part of the Spaniards the deals were negotiated by Grigori Rosenberg, son of well-known Soviet diplomat, and Máximo José Kahn Mussabaun, the Spanish representative in the Thessaloniki consulate. Shipments set off usually from Piraeus, were camouflaged at a deserted island, and with changed flags they proceeded officially to ports in Mexico. It is known that sales continued from August 1936 at least until November 1938. Exact number of shipments is unknown, but it remained significant: by November 1937 34 Greek ships were declared non-compliant with the non-intervention agreement, and the Nationalist navy seized 21 vessels in 1938 alone. Details of sales to the Nationalists are unclear, but it is known they were by far smaller.

Total worth of Greek sales is unknown. One author claims that in 1937 alone, GPCC shipments amounted to $10.9m for the Republicans and $2.7m for the Nationalists, and that in late 1937 Bodosakis signed another contract with the Republicans for £2.1m (around $10m), though it is not clear whether the ammunition contracted was delivered. The arms sold included artillery (e.g. 30 pieces of 155mm guns), machine guns (at least 400), cartridges (at least 11m), bombs (at least 1,500) and explosives (at least 38 tons of TNT).

Mexico 
Unlike the United States and major Latin American governments, such as the ABC nations and Peru, the Mexican government supported the Republicans. Mexico abstained from following the French-British non-intervention proposals, and provided $2,000,000 in aid and material assistance, which included 20,000 rifles and 20 million cartridges.

Mexico's most important contributions to the Spanish Republic was its diplomatic help, as well as the sanctuary the nation arranged for Republican refugees, including Spanish intellectuals and orphaned children from Republican families. Some 50,000 took refuge, primarily in Mexico City and Morelia, accompanied by $300 million in various treasures still owned by the Left.

France 
Fearing it might spark a civil war inside France, the leftist "Popular Front" government in France did not send direct support to the Republicans. French Prime Minister Léon Blum was sympathetic to the republic, fearing that the success of Nationalist forces in Spain would result in the creation of an ally state of Nazi Germany and Fascist Italy, an alliance that would nearly encircle France. Right-wing politicians opposed any aid and attacked the Blum government. In July 1936, British officials convinced Blum not to send arms to the Republicans and, on 27 July, the French government declared that it would not send military aid, technology or forces to assist the Republican forces. However, Blum made clear that France reserved the right to provide aid should it wish to the Republic: "We could have delivered arms to the Spanish Government [Republicans], a legitimate government... We have not done so, in order not to give an excuse to those who would be tempted to send arms to the rebels [Nationalists]."

On 1 August 1936, a pro-Republican rally of 20,000 people confronted Blum, demanding that he send aircraft to the Republicans, at the same time as right-wing politicians attacked Blum for supporting the Republic and being responsible for provoking Italian intervention on the side of Franco. Germany informed the French ambassador in Berlin that Germany would hold France responsible if it supported "the manoeuvres of Moscow" by supporting the Republicans. On 21 August 1936, France signed the Non-Intervention Agreement. However, the Blum government provided aircraft to the Republicans covertly with Potez 540 bomber aircraft (nicknamed the "Flying Coffin" by Spanish Republican pilots), Dewoitine aircraft, and Loire 46 fighter aircraft being sent from 7 August 1936 to December of that year to Republican forces. France, through the favour of pro-communist air minister Pierre Cot also sent a group of trained fighter pilots and engineers to help the Republicans. Also, until 8 September 1936, aircraft could freely pass from France into Spain if they were bought in other countries.

Even after covert support by France to the Republicans ended in December 1936, the possibility of French intervention against the Nationalists remained a serious possibility throughout the war. German intelligence reported to Franco and the Nationalists that the French military was engaging in open discussions about intervention in the war through French military intervention in Catalonia and the Balearic Islands. In 1938, Franco feared an immediate French intervention against a potential Nationalist victory in Spain through French occupation of Catalonia, the Balearic Islands, and Spanish Morocco.

Course of the war

1936 

A large air and sealift of Nationalist troops in Spanish Morocco was organised to the southwest of Spain. Coup leader Sanjurjo was killed in a plane crash on 20 July, leaving an effective command split between Mola in the North and Franco in the South. This period also saw the worst actions of the so-called "Red" and "White Terrors" in Spain. On 21 July, the fifth day of the rebellion, the Nationalists captured the central Spanish naval base, located in Ferrol, Galicia.

A rebel force under Colonel Alfonso Beorlegui Canet, sent by General Mola and Colonel Esteban García, undertook the Campaign of Gipuzkoa from July to September. The capture of Gipuzkoa isolated the Republican provinces in the north. On 5 September, the Nationalists closed the French border to the Republicans in the battle of Irún. On 15 September San Sebastián, home to a divided Republican force of anarchists and Basque nationalists, was taken by Nationalist soldiers.

The Republic proved ineffective militarily, relying on disorganised revolutionary militias. The Republican government under Giral resigned on 4 September, unable to cope with the situation, and was replaced by a mostly Socialist organisation under Francisco Largo Caballero. The new leadership began to unify central command in the republican zone. The civilian militias were often simply just civilians armed with whatever was available. Thus they fared poorly in combat, particularly against the professional Army of Africa armed with modern weapons, ultimately contributing to Franco's rapid advance.

On the Nationalist side, Franco was chosen as chief military commander at a meeting of ranking generals at Salamanca on 21 September, now called by the title Generalísimo. Franco won another victory on 27 September when his troops relieved the siege of the Alcázar in Toledo, which had been held by a Nationalist garrison under Colonel José Moscardó Ituarte since the beginning of the rebellion, resisting thousands of Republican troops, who completely surrounded the isolated building. Moroccans and elements of the Spanish Legion came to the rescue. Two days after relieving the siege, Franco proclaimed himself Caudillo ("chieftain", the Spanish equivalent of the Italian Duce and the German Führer—meaning: 'director') while forcibly unifying the various and diverse Falangist, Royalist and other elements within the Nationalist cause. The diversion to Toledo gave Madrid time to prepare a defense, but was hailed as a major propaganda victory and personal success for Franco. On 1 October 1936, General Franco was confirmed head of state and armies in Burgos. A similar dramatic success for the Nationalists occurred on 17 October, when troops coming from Galicia relieved the besieged town of Oviedo, in Northern Spain.

In October, the Francoist troops launched a major offensive toward Madrid, reaching it in early November and launching a major assault on the city on 8 November. The Republican government was forced to shift from Madrid to Valencia, outside the combat zone, on 6 November. However, the Nationalists' attack on the capital was repulsed in fierce fighting between 8 and 23 November. A contributory factor in the successful Republican defense was the effectiveness of the Fifth Regiment and later the arrival of the International Brigades, though only an approximate 3,000 foreign volunteers participated in the battle. Having failed to take the capital, Franco bombarded it from the air and, in the following two years, mounted several offensives to try to encircle Madrid, beginning the three-year siege of Madrid. The Second Battle of the Corunna Road, a Nationalist offensive to the northwest, pushed Republican forces back, but failed to isolate Madrid. The battle lasted into January.

1937 

With his ranks swelled by Italian troops and Spanish colonial soldiers from Morocco, Franco made another attempt to capture Madrid in January and February 1937, but was again unsuccessful. The Battle of Málaga started in mid-January, and this Nationalist offensive in Spain's southeast would turn into a disaster for the Republicans, who were poorly organised and armed. The city was taken by Franco on 8 February. The consolidation of various militias into the Republican Army had started in December 1936. The main Nationalist advance to cross the Jarama and cut the supply to Madrid by the Valencia road, termed the Battle of Jarama, led to heavy casualties (6,000–20,000) on both sides. The operation's main objective was not met, though Nationalists gained a modest amount of territory.

A similar Nationalist offensive, the Battle of Guadalajara, was a more significant defeat for Franco and his armies. This was the only publicised Republican victory of the war. Franco used Italian troops and blitzkrieg tactics; while many strategists blamed Franco for the rightists' defeat, the Germans believed it was the former at fault for the Nationalists' 5,000 casualties and loss of valuable equipment. The German strategists successfully argued that the Nationalists needed to concentrate on vulnerable areas first.

The "War in the North" began in mid-March, with the Biscay Campaign. The Basques suffered most from the lack of a suitable air force. On 26 April, the Condor Legion bombed the town of Guernica, killing 200–300 and causing significant damage. The destruction had a significant effect on international opinion. The Basques retreated.

April and May saw the May Days, infighting among Republican groups in Catalonia. The dispute was between an ultimately victorious government—Communist forces and the anarchist CNT. The disturbance pleased Nationalist command, but little was done to exploit Republican divisions. After the fall of Guernica, the Republican government began to fight back with increasing effectiveness. In July, it made a move to recapture Segovia, forcing Franco to delay his advance on the Bilbao front, but for only two weeks. The Huesca Offensive failed similarly.

Mola, Franco's second-in-command, was killed on 3 June, in an airplane accident. In early July, despite the earlier loss at the Battle of Bilbao, the government launched a strong counter-offensive to the west of Madrid, focusing on Brunete. The Battle of Brunete, however, was a significant defeat for the Republic, which lost many of its most accomplished troops.

A Republican offensive against Zaragoza was also a failure. Despite having land and aerial advantages, the Battle of Belchite, a place lacking any military interest, resulted in an advance of only  and the loss of much equipment. Franco invaded Aragón and took the city of Santander in Cantabria in August. With the surrender of the Republican army in the Basque territory came the Santoña Agreement. Gijón finally fell in late October in the Asturias Offensive. Franco had effectively won in the north. At November's end, with Franco's troops closing in on Valencia, the government had to move again, this time to Barcelona.

1938 

The Battle of Teruel was an important confrontation. The city, which had formerly belonged to the Nationalists, was conquered by Republicans in January. The Francoist troops launched an offensive and recovered the city by 22 February, but Franco was forced to rely heavily on German and Italian air support.

On 7 March, Nationalists launched the Aragon Offensive, and by 14 April they had pushed through to the Mediterranean, cutting the Republican-held portion of Spain in two. The Republican government attempted to sue for peace in May, but Franco demanded unconditional surrender, and the war raged on. In July, the Nationalist army pressed southward from Teruel and south along the coast toward the capital of the Republic at Valencia, but was halted in heavy fighting along the XYZ Line, a system of fortifications defending Valencia.

The Republican government then launched an all-out campaign to reconnect their territory in the Battle of the Ebro, from 24 July until 26 November, where Franco personally took command. The campaign was unsuccessful, and was undermined by the agreement signed in Munich between Hitler and Chamberlain. The Munich Agreement effectively caused a collapse in Republican morale by ending hope of an anti-fascist alliance with Western powers. The retreat from the Ebro all but determined the outcome of the war. Eight days before the new year, Franco threw massive forces into an invasion of Catalonia.

1939 

Franco's troops conquered Catalonia in a whirlwind campaign during the first two months of 1939. Tarragona fell on 15 January, followed by Barcelona on 26 January and Girona on 2 February. On 27 February, the United Kingdom and France recognized the Franco regime.

Only Madrid and a few other strongholds remained for the Republican forces. On 5 March 1939 the Republican army, led by the Colonel Segismundo Casado and the politician Julián Besteiro, rose against the prime minister Juan Negrín and formed the National Defence Council (Consejo Nacional de Defensa or CND) to negotiate a peace deal. Negrín fled to France on 6 March, but the Communist troops around Madrid rose against the junta, starting a brief civil war within the civil war. Casado defeated them, and began peace negotiations with the Nationalists, but Franco refused to accept anything less than unconditional surrender.

On 26 March, the Nationalists started a general offensive, on 28 March the Nationalists occupied Madrid and, by 31 March, they controlled all Spanish territory. Franco proclaimed victory in a radio speech aired on 1 April, when the last of the Republican forces surrendered.

After the end of the war, there were harsh reprisals against Franco's former enemies. Thousands of Republicans were imprisoned and at least 30,000 executed. Other estimates of these deaths range from 50,000 to 200,000, depending on which deaths are included. Many others were put to forced labour, building railways, draining swamps, and digging canals.

Hundreds of thousands of Republicans fled abroad, with some 500,000 fleeing to France. Refugees were confined in internment camps of the French Third Republic, such as Camp Gurs or Camp Vernet, where 12,000 Republicans were housed in squalid conditions. In his capacity as consul in Paris, Chilean poet and politician Pablo Neruda organised the immigration to Chile of 2,200 Republican exiles in France using the ship .

Of the 17,000 refugees housed in Gurs, farmers and others who could not find relations in France were encouraged by the Third Republic, in agreement with the Francoist government, to return to Spain. The great majority did so and were turned over to the Francoist authorities in Irún. From there, they were transferred to the Miranda de Ebro camp for "purification" according to the Law of Political Responsibilities. After the proclamation by Marshal Philippe Pétain of the Vichy regime, the refugees became political prisoners, and the French police attempted to round up those who had been liberated from the camp. Along with other "undesirable" people, the Spaniards were sent to the Drancy internment camp before being deported to Nazi Germany. About 5,000 Spaniards died in the Mauthausen concentration camp.

After the official end of the war, guerrilla warfare was waged on an irregular basis by the Spanish Maquis well into the 1950s, gradually reduced by military defeats and scant support from the exhausted population. In 1944, a group of republican veterans, who also fought in the French resistance against the Nazis, invaded the Val d'Aran in northwest Catalonia, but were defeated after 10 days. According to some scholars, the Spanish Civil War lasted until 1952; until 1939 it was "conventional civil war", but afterwards it turned into an "irregular civil war".

Evacuation of children 

The Republicans oversaw the evacuation of 30,000–35,000 children from their zone, starting with Basque areas, from which 20,000 were evacuated. Their destinations included the United Kingdom and the USSR, and many other countries in Europe, along with Mexico. The policy of evacuating children to foreign countries was initially opposed to by elements in the government as well as private charities, who saw the policy as unnecessary and harmful to the well-being of the evacuated children. On 21 May 1937, around 4,000 Basque children were evacuated to the UK on the aging steamship SS Habana from the Spanish port of Santurtzi. Upon their arrival two days later in Southampton, the children were sent to families all over England, with over 200 children accommodated in Wales. The upper age limit was initially set at 12, but raised to 15. By mid-September, all of los niños, as they became known, had found homes with families. Most were repatriated to Spain after the war, but some 250 were still in Britain by the end of the Second World War in 1945. Some chose to settle down in Britain, while the remaining children were eventually evacuated back to Spain.

Financing 

During the Civil War the Nationalist and Republican military expenditures combined totalled some $3.89bn, on average $1.44bn annually. The overall Nationalist expenditures are calculated at $2.04bn, while the Republican ones reached ca. $1,85bn. In comparison, in 1936–1938 the French military expenditure totalled $0.87bn, the Italian ones reached $2.64bn, and the British ones stood at $4.13bn. As in the mid-1930s the Spanish GDP was much smaller than the Italian, French or British ones, and as in the Second Republic the annual defence and security budget was usually around $0,13bn (total annual governmental spendings were close to $0.65bn), wartime military expenditures put huge strain on the Spanish economy. Financing the war posed enormous challenge for both the Nationalists and the Republicans.

The two combatant parties followed similar financial strategies; in both cases money creation, rather than new taxes or issue of debt, was key to financing the war.

Both sides relied mostly on domestic resources; in case of the Nationalists they amounted to 63% of the overall spendings ($1.28bn) and in case of the Republicans they stood at 59% ($1.09bn). In the Nationalist zone money creation was responsible for some 69% of domestic resources, while in the Republican one the corresponding figure stood at 60%; it was accomplished mostly by means of advances, credits, loans and debit balances from respective central banks. However, while in the Nationalist zone the rising stock of money was only marginally above the production growth rate, in the Republican zone it by far exceeded dwindling production figures. The result was that while by the end of the war the Nationalist inflation was 41% compared to 1936, the Republican one was in triple digits. The second component of domestic resource was fiscal revenue. In the Nationalist zone it grew steadily and in the 2nd half of 1938 it was 214% of the figure from the 2nd half of 1936. In the Republican zone fiscal revenues in 1937 dropped to some 25% of revenues recorded in the proportional area in 1935, but recovered slightly in 1938. Neither side re-engineered the pre-war tax system; differences resulted from dramatic problems with tax collection in the Republican zone and from the course of the war, as more and more population was governed by the Nationalists. A smaller percentage of domestic resources came from expropriations, donations or internal borrowing.

Foreign resources amounted to 37% in case of the Nationalists ($0,76bn) and 41% in case of the Republicans ($0,77bn). For the Nationalists it was mostly the Italian and German credit; in case of the Republicans it was sales of gold reserves, mostly to the USSR and in much smaller amount to France. None of the sides resolved to public borrowing and none floated debt on foreign exchange markets.

Authors of recent studies suggest that given Nationalist and Republican spendings were comparable, earlier theory pointing to Republican mismanagement of resources is no longer tenable. Instead, they claim that the Republicans failed to translate their resources into military victory largely because of constraints of the international non-intervention agreement; they were forced to spend in excess of market prices and accept goods of lower quality. Initial turmoil in the Republican zone contributed to problems, while at later stages the course of the war meant that population, territory and resources kept shrinking.

Death toll 

The death toll of the Spanish Civil War is far from clear and remains—especially in part related to war and postwar repression—a very controversial issue. Many general historiographic works—notably in Spain—refrain from advancing any figures; massive historical series, encyclopedias or dictionaries provide no numbers or at best propose vague general descriptions; more detailed general history accounts produced by expert Spanish scholars often remain silent on the issue. Foreign scholars, especially English-speaking historians, are more willing to offer some general estimates, though some have revised their projections, usually downward, and the figures vary from 1 million to 250,000. Apart from bias/ill will, incompetence or changing access to sources, the differences result chiefly from categorisation and methodology issues.

The totals advanced usually include or exclude various categories. Scholars who focus on killings or "violent deaths" most typically list (1) combat and combat-related deaths; figures in this rubric range from 100,000 to 700,000; (2) rearguard terror, both judicial and extrajudicial, recorded until the end of the Civil War: 103,000 to 235,000; (3) civilian deaths from military action, typically air raids: 10,000 to 15,000. These categories combined point to totals from 235,000 to 715,000. Many authors opt for a broader view and calculate "death toll" by adding also (4) above-the-norm deaths caused by malnutrition, hygiene shortcomings, cold, illness, etc. recorded until the end of the Civil War: 30,000 to 630,000. It is not unusual to encounter war statistics which include (5) postwar terror related to Civil War, at times up to the year of 1961: 23,000 to 200,000. Some authors also add (6) foreign combat and combat-related deaths: 3,000 to 25,000, (7) Spaniards killed in World War II: 6,000, (8) deaths related to postwar guerilla, typically the Invasion of Val d'Aran: 4,000, (9) above-the-norm deaths caused by malnutrition, etc., recorded after the Civil War but related to it: 160,000 to 300,000.

Demographers take an entirely different approach; instead of adding up deaths from different categories, they try to gauge the difference between the total number of deaths recorded during the war and the total that would result from applying annual death averages from the 1926–1935 period; this difference is considered excess death resulting from the war. The figure they arrive at for the 1936–1939 period is 346,000; the figure for 1936–1942, including the years of postwar deaths resulting from terror and war sufferings, is 540,000. Some scholars go even further and calculate the war's "population loss" or "demographic impact"; in this case they might include also (10) migration abroad: 160,000 to 730,000 and (11) decrease in birth rate: 500,000 to 570,000.

Atrocities 

Death totals remain debated. British historian Antony Beevor wrote in his history of the Civil War that Franco's ensuing "white terror" resulted in the deaths of 200,000 people and that the "red terror" killed 38,000. Julius Ruiz contends that, "Although the figures remain disputed, a minimum of 37,843 executions were carried out in the Republican zone, with a maximum of 150,000 executions (including 50,000 after the war) in Nationalist Spain". Historian Michael Seidman stated that the Nationalists killed approximately 130,000 people and the Republicans approximately 50,000 people.

In 2008 a Spanish judge, Baltasar Garzón, opened an investigation into the executions and disappearances of 114,266 people between 17 July 1936 and December 1951. Among the executions investigated was that of the poet and dramatist Federico García Lorca, whose body has never been found. Mention of García Lorca's death was forbidden during Franco's regime.

Research since 2016 has started to locate mass graves, using a combination of witness testimony, remote sensing and forensic geophysics techniques.

Historians such as Helen Graham, Paul Preston, Antony Beevor, Gabriel Jackson and Hugh Thomas argue that the mass executions behind the Nationalist lines were organised and approved by the Nationalist rebel authorities, while the executions behind the Republican lines were the result of the breakdown of the Republican state and chaos:

Conversely, historians such as Stanley Payne, Julius Ruiz and José Sánchez argue that the political violence in the Republican zone was in fact organized by the left:

Nationalists 

Nationalist atrocities, which authorities frequently ordered so as to eradicate any trace of "leftism" in Spain, were common. The notion of a limpieza (cleansing) formed an essential part of the rebel strategy, and the process began immediately after an area had been captured. Estimates of the death toll vary; historian Paul Preston estimates the minimum number of those executed by the rebels as 130,000, while Antony Beevor places the figure much higher at an estimated 200,000 dead. The violence was carried out in the rebel zone by the military, the Civil Guard and the Falange in the name of the regime. Julius Ruiz reports that the Nationalists killed 100,000 people during the war and executed at least 28,000 immediately after. The first three months of the war were the bloodiest, with 50 to 70 percent of all executions carried out by Franco's regime, from 1936 to 1975, occurring during this period. The first few months of killings lacked much in the way of centralisation, being largely in the hands of local commanders. Such was the extent of the killings of civilians that General Mola was taken aback by them, despite his own planning emphasising the need for violence; early in the conflict he had ordered a group of leftist militiamen to be immediately executed, only to change his mind and rescind the order.

Many such acts were committed by reactionary groups during the first weeks of the war. This included the execution of schoolteachers, because the efforts of the Second Spanish Republic to promote laicism and displace the Church from schools by closing religious educational institutions were considered by the Nationalists as an attack on the Roman Catholic Church. Extensive killings of civilians were carried out in the cities captured by the Nationalists, along with the execution of unwanted individuals. These included non-combatants such as trade-unionists, Popular Front politicians, suspected Freemasons, Basque, Catalan, Andalusian, and Galician Nationalists, Republican intellectuals, relatives of known Republicans, and those suspected of voting for the Popular Front. The Nationalists also frequently killed military officers who refused to support them in the early days of the coup. Many killings in the first few months were often done by vigilantes and civilian death squads, with the Nationalist leadership often condoning their actions or even assisting them. Post-war executions were conducted by military tribunal, though the accused had limited ways to defend themselves. A large number of the executed were done so for their political activities or positions they held under the Republic during the war, though those who committed their own killings under the Republic were also amongst executed as well. A 2010 analysis of Catalonia argued that Nationalist executions were more likely to occur when they occupied an area that experienced greater prior violence, likely due to pro-Nationalist civilians seeking revenge for earlier actions by denouncing others to the Nationalist forces. However, during the war, executions declined as the Francoist state began to establish itself.

Nationalist forces massacred civilians in Seville, where some 8,000 people were shot; 10,000 were killed in Cordoba; 6,000–12,000 were killed in Badajoz after more than one thousand of landowners and conservatives were killed by the revolutionaries. In Granada, where working-class neighbourhoods were hit with artillery and right-wing squads were given free rein to kill government sympathizers, at least 2,000 people were murdered. In February 1937, over 7,000 were killed after the capture of Málaga. When Bilbao was conquered, thousands of people were sent to prison. There were fewer executions than usual, however, because of the effect Guernica left on Nationalists' reputations internationally. The numbers killed as the columns of the Army of Africa devastated and pillaged their way between Seville and Madrid are particularly difficult to calculate. Landowners who owned the large estates of Southern Spain rode alongside the Army of Africa to reclaim via force of arms the land given to the landless peasants by the Republican government. Rural workers were executed and it was joked that they had received their "land reform" in the form of a burial plot.

Nationalists also murdered Catholic clerics. In one particular incident, following the capture of Bilbao, they took hundreds of people, including 16 priests who had served as chaplains for the Republican forces, to the countryside or graveyards and murdered them.

Franco's forces also persecuted Protestants, including murdering 20 Protestant ministers. Franco's forces were determined to remove the "Protestant heresy" from Spain. The Nationalists also persecuted Basques, as they strove to eradicate Basque culture. According to Basque sources, some 22,000 Basques were murdered by Nationalists immediately after the Civil War.

The Nationalist side conducted aerial bombing of cities in Republican territory, carried out mainly by the Luftwaffe volunteers of the Condor Legion and the Italian air force volunteers of the Corpo Truppe Volontarie: Madrid, Barcelona, Valencia, Guernica, Durango, and other cities were attacked. The Bombing of Guernica was the most controversial. The Italian air force conducted a particularly heavy bombing raid on Barcelona in early 1938. While some Nationalist leaders did oppose the bombing of the city—for example, Generals Yagüe and Moscardó, who were noted for being nonconformists, protested against the indiscriminate destruction—other Nationalist leaders, often those of a fascist persuasion, approved of the bombings which they saw as necessary to "cleanse" Barcelona.

Michael Seidman observes that the Nationalist terror was a key part of the Nationalist victory as it allowed them to secure their rear; the Russian Whites, in their civil war, had struggled to suppress peasant rebellions, bandits and warlordism behind their lines; British observers argued that if the Russian Whites had been able to secure law and order behind their lines, they would have won over the Russian peasantry, while the inability of the Chinese Nationalists to stop banditry during the Chinese Civil War did severe damage to the regime's legitimacy. The Spanish Nationalists, in contrast, imposed a puritanically terrorist order on the populace in their territory. They never suffered from serious partisan activity behind their lines and the fact that banditry did not develop into a serious problem in Spain, despite how easy it would have been in such mountainous terrain, demands explanation. Seidman argues that severe terror, combined with control of the food supply, explains the general lack of guerilla warfare in the Nationalist rear. A 2009 analysis of Nationalist violence argues that evidence supports the view that killings were used strategically by the Nationalists to pre-emptively counter potential opposition by targeting individuals and groups deemed most likely to cultivate future rebellions, thus helping the Nationalists win the war.

Republicans 

Scholars have estimated that between 38,000 and 70,000 civilians were killed in Republican-held territories, with the most common estimate being around 50,000.

Whatever the exact number, the death toll was far exaggerated by both sides, for propaganda reasons, giving birth to the legend of the millón de muertos. Franco's government would later give names of 61,000 victims of the red terrors, but which are not considered objectively verifiable. The deaths would form the prevailing outside opinion of the republic up until the bombing of Guernica.

The leftist Revolution of 1936 that preceded the war was accompanied since the first months by an escalation of leftist anticlerical terror that, between 18 and 31 July alone, killed 839 religious, continuing during the month of August with 2055 other victims, including 10 bishops killed, that was 42% of the total number of registered victims in that year. Particularly noteworthy repression was conducted in Madrid during the war.

The Republican government was anticlerical, and, when the war began, supporters attacked and murdered Roman Catholic clergy in reaction to the news of military revolt. In his 1961 book, Spanish archbishop Antonio Montero Moreno, who at the time was director of the journal Ecclesia, wrote that 6,832 were killed during the war, including 4,184 priests, 2,365 monks and friars, and 283 nuns (many were first raped before they died), in addition to 13 bishops, a figure accepted by historians, including Beevor. Some of the killings were carried out with extreme cruelty, some were burned to death, there are reports of castration and disembowelment. Some sources claim that by the conflict's end, 20 percent of the nation's clergy had been killed. The "Execution" of the Sacred Heart of Jesus by Communist militiamen at Cerro de los Ángeles near Madrid, on 7 August 1936, was the most infamous of widespread desecration of religious property. In dioceses where the Republicans had general control, a large proportion—often a majority—of secular priests were killed. Michael Seidman argues that the hatred of the Republicans for the clergy was in excess of anything else; while local revolutionaries might spare the lives of the rich and right-wingers, they seldom offered the same to priests.

Like clergy, civilians were executed in Republican territories. Some civilians were executed as suspected Falangists. Others died in acts of revenge after Republicans heard of massacres carried out in the Nationalist zone. Even families who simply attended Catholic Mass were hunted down; including children. Air raids committed against Republican cities were another driving factor. Shopkeepers and industrialists were shot if they did not sympathise with the Republicans, and were usually spared if they did. Fake justice was sought through commissions, named checas after the Soviet secret police organization.
 Many killings were done by paseos, impromptu death squads that emerged as a spontaneous practice amongst revolutionary activists in Republican areas. According to Seidman, the Republican government only made efforts to stop the actions of the paseos late in the war; during the first few months, the government either tolerated it or made no efforts to stop it. The killings often contained a symbolic element, as those killed were seen as embodying an oppressive source of power and authority. This was also why the Republicans would kill priests or employers who were not considered to personally have done anything wrong but were nonetheless seen as representing the old oppressive order that needed to be destroyed.

It is important to note that there was infighting between the Republican factions, and that the Communists following Stalinism declared the Workers' Party of Marxist Unification (POUM, an anti-Stalinist communist party) to be an illegal organization, along with the Anarchists. The Stalinists betrayed and committed mass atrocities on the other Republican factions, such as torture and mass executions. George Orwell would record this in his Homage to Catalonia as well as write Nineteen Eighty-Four and Animal Farm to criticize Stalinism.
As pressure mounted with the increasing success of the Nationalists, many civilians were executed by councils and tribunals controlled by competing Communist and anarchist groups. Some members of the latter were executed by Soviet-advised communist functionaries in Catalonia, as recounted by George Orwell's description of the purges in Barcelona in 1937 in which followed a period of increasing tension between competing elements of the Catalan political scene. Some individuals fled to friendly embassies, which would house up to 8,500 people during the war.

In the Andalusian town of Ronda, 512 suspected Nationalists were executed in the first month of the war. Communist Santiago Carrillo Solares was accused of the killing of Nationalists in the Paracuellos massacre near Paracuellos de Jarama. Pro-Soviet Communists committed numerous atrocities against fellow Republicans, including other Marxists: André Marty, known as the Butcher of Albacete, was responsible for the deaths of some 500 members of the International Brigades. Andrés Nin, leader of the POUM (Workers' Party of Marxist Unification), and many other prominent POUM members, were murdered by the Communists, with the help of the USSR's NKVD.

The Republicans also conducted their own bombing attacks on cities, such as the bombing of Cabra, and in fact conducted more indiscriminate air raids on cities and civilian targets than the Nationalists.

Thirty-eight thousand people were killed in the Republican zone during the war, 17,000 of whom were killed in Madrid or Catalonia within a month of the coup. Whilst the Communists were forthright in their support of extrajudicial killings, much of the Republican side was appalled by the murders. Azaña came close to resigning. He, alongside other members of Parliament and a great number of other local officials, attempted to prevent Nationalist supporters from being lynched. Some of those in positions of power intervened personally to stop the killings.

Social revolution 

In the anarchist-controlled areas, Aragon and Catalonia, in addition to the temporary military success, there was a vast social revolution in which the workers and peasants collectivised land and industry and set up councils parallel to the paralyzed Republican government. This revolution was opposed by the Soviet-supported communists who, perhaps surprisingly, campaigned against the loss of civil property rights.

As the war progressed, the government and the communists were able to exploit their access to Soviet arms to restore government control over the war effort, through diplomacy and force. Anarchists and the Workers' Party of Marxist Unification (Partido Obrero de Unificación Marxista, POUM) were integrated into the regular army, albeit with resistance. The POUM Trotskyists were outlawed and denounced by the Soviet-aligned Communists as an instrument of the fascists. In the May Days of 1937, many thousands of anarchist and communist Republican soldiers fought for control of strategic points in Barcelona.

The pre-war Falange was a small party of some 30,000–40,000 members. It also called for a social revolution that would have seen Spanish society transformed by National Syndicalism. Following the execution of its leader, José Antonio Primo de Rivera, by the Republicans, the party swelled in size to several hundred thousand members. The leadership of the Falange suffered 60 percent casualties in the early days of the civil war, and the party was transformed by new members and rising new leaders, called camisas nuevas ("new shirts"), who were less interested in the revolutionary aspects of National Syndicalism. Subsequently, Franco united all fighting groups into the Traditionalist Spanish Falange and the National Syndicalist Offensive Juntas (FET y de las JONS).

The 1930s also saw Spain become a focus for pacifist organisations, including the Fellowship of Reconciliation, the War Resisters League, and the War Resisters' International. Many people including, as they are now called, the insumisos ("defiant ones", conscientious objectors) argued and worked for non-violent strategies. Prominent Spanish pacifists, such as Amparo Poch y Gascón and José Brocca, supported the Republicans. Brocca argued that Spanish pacifists had no alternative but to make a stand against fascism. He put this stand into practice by various means, including organizing agricultural workers to maintain food supplies, and through humanitarian work with war refugees.

Art and propaganda 

Throughout the course of the Spanish Civil War, people all over the world were exposed to the goings-on and effects of it on its people not only through standard art, but also through propaganda. Motion pictures, posters, books, radio programs, and leaflets are a few examples of this media art that was so influential during the war. Produced by both nationalists and republicans, propaganda allowed Spaniards a way to spread awareness about their war all over the world. A film co-produced by famous early-twentieth century authors such as Ernest Hemingway and Lillian Hellman was used as a way to advertise Spain's need for military and monetary aid. This film, The Spanish Earth, premiered in America in July 1937. In 1938, George Orwell's Homage to Catalonia, a personal account of his experiences and observations in the war, was published in the United Kingdom. In 1939, Jean-Paul Sartre published in France a short story, "The Wall" in which he describes the last night of prisoners of war sentenced to death by shooting.

Leading works of sculpture include Alberto Sánchez Pérez's El pueblo español tiene un camino que conduce a una estrella ("The Spanish People Have a Path that Leads to a Star"), a 12.5 m monolith constructed out of plaster representing the struggle for a socialist utopia; Julio González's La Montserrat, an anti-war work which shares its title with a mountain near Barcelona, is created from a sheet of iron which has been hammered and welded to create a peasant mother carrying a small child in one arm and a sickle in the other. and Alexander Calder's Fuente de mercurio (Mercury Fountain) a protest work by the American against the Nationalist forced control of Almadén and the mercury mines there.

Salvador Dalí responded to the conflict in his homeland with two powerful oil paintings in 1936: Soft Construction with Boiled Beans: A Premonition of Civil War (Philadelphia Museum of Art) and Autumnal Cannibalism (Tate Modern, London). Of the former, the art historian Robert Hughes stated, "Salvador Dalí appropriated the horizontal thigh of Goya's crouching Saturn for the hybrid monster in the painting Soft Construction with Boiled Beans, Premonition of Civil War, which rather than Picasso's Guernica – is the finest single work of visual art inspired by the Spanish Civil War." On the later, Dalí commented "These Iberian beings mutually devouring each other correspond to the pathos of civil war considered as a pure phenomenon of natural history as opposed to Picasso who considered it a political phenomenon."

Pablo Picasso painted Guernica in 1937, taking inspiration from the bombing of Guernica, and in Leonardo da Vinci's Battle of Anghiari. Guernica, like many important Republican masterpieces, was featured at the 1937 International Exhibition in Paris. The work's size (11 ft by 25.6 ft) grabbed much attention and cast the horrors of the mounting Spanish civil unrest into a global spotlight. The painting has since been heralded as an anti-war work and a symbol of peace in the 20th century.

Joan Miró created El Segador (The Reaper) in 1937, formally titled El campesino catalán en rebeldía (Catalan peasant in revolt), which spans some 18 feet by 12 feet and depicted a peasant brandishing a sickle in the air, to which Miró commented that "The sickle is not a communist symbol. It is the reaper's symbol, the tool of his work, and, when his freedom is threatened, his weapon." This work, also featured at the 1937 International Exhibition in Paris, was shipped back to the Spanish Republic's capital in Valencia following the Exhibition, but has since gone missing or has been destroyed.

The Army of Africa would feature a place in propaganda on both sides, due to the complex history of the Army and Spanish colonialism in North Africa. Both sides would invent different characters of the Moorish troops, drawing on a wide range of historical symbols, cultural prejudices and racial stereotypes. The Army of Africa would be used as part of a propaganda campaign by both sides to portray the other side as foreign invaders attacking from outside the national community, while portraying their own as representing "true Spain".

Consequences

Economic effects 
Payment for the war on both sides was very high. Monetary resources on the Republican side were completely drained from weapon acquisition. On the Nationalist side, the biggest losses came after the conflict, when they had to let Germany exploit the country's mining resources, so until the beginning of World War II they barely had the chance to make any profit.

Victims 
The number of civilian victims is still being discussed, with some estimating approximately 500,000 victims, while others go as high as 1,000,000. These deaths were not only due to combat, but also executions, which were especially well-organised and systematic on the Nationalist side, being more disorganised on the Republican side (mainly caused by loss of control of the armed masses by the government).
However, the 500,000 death toll does not include deaths by malnutrition, hunger or diseases brought about by the war.

Francoist repression after the war and Republican exile 

After the War, the Francoist regime initiated a repressive process against the losing side, a "cleansing" of sorts against anything or anyone associated with the Republic. This process led many to exile or death.
Exile happened in three waves. The first one was during the Northern Campaign (March–November 1937), followed by a second wave after the fall of Catalonia (January–February 1939), in which about 400,000 people fled to France. The French authorities had to improvise concentration camps, with such hard conditions that almost half of the exiled Spaniards returned. The third wave occurred after the War, at the end of March 1939, when thousands of Republicans tried to board ships to exile, although few succeeded.

International relations 
The political and emotional repercussions of the War transcended the national scale, becoming a precursor to the Second World War. The war has frequently been described by historians as the "prelude to" or the "opening round of" the Second World War, as part of an international battle against fascism. Historian Stanley Payne suggests that this view is an incorrect summary of the geopolitic position of the interwar period, arguing that the international alliance that was created in December 1941, once the United States entered the Second World War, was politically much broader than the Spanish Popular Front. The Spanish Civil War, Payne argues, was thus a far more clear-cut revolutionary and counter-revolutionary struggle between the left and right wings, while the Second World War initially had fascists and communist powers on the same side with the combined Nazi-Soviet invasion of Poland. Payne suggests that instead the civil war was the last of the revolutionary crises that emerged from the First World War, observing it had parallels such as the complete revolutionary breakdown of domestic institutions, the development of full-scale revolutionary and counter-revolutionary struggles, the development of a typical post-WW1 communist force in the form of the People's Army, an extreme exacerbation of nationalism, the frequent use of WW1-style military weapons and tactics and the fact that it was not the product of the plan of any of the major powers, making it more similar to the post-WW1 crises which arose after the Treaty of Versailles.

After the War, Spanish policy leaned heavily towards Germany, Portugal and Italy, since they had been the greatest Nationalist supporters and aligned with Spain ideologically. However, the end of the Civil War and later the Second World War saw the isolation of the country from most other nations until the 1950s, in which the American anti-Communist international policy favoured having a far-right and extremely anti-communist ally in Europe.

Interpretations; civil war in perspective

There have been numerous attempts to define the Spanish Civil War in terms of its key mechanism, prevailing logic and dominant conflict line; many of these interpretations strove also to identify the conflict in terms of major threads of continental or even global history. These attempts might not differ much from propaganda, advanced by both warring parties or their sympathizers; they might form part of broad public discourse, either in Spain or abroad; they might also belong to professional academic historiographic debate. Major theories are listed in the below table.

See also

Notes

References

Citations

Sources

Further reading 

 
 
 
 De Meneses, Filipe Ribeiro Franco and the Spanish Civil War, Routledge, London, 2001
 
 
 
 .
 .
 
 
 
 
 
 
 Pérez de Urbel, Justo (1993). Catholic Martyrs of the Spanish Civil War, 1936–1939, trans. by Michael F. Ingrams. Kansas City, MO: Angelus Press. 
 
 Preston, Paul (2016) The Last Days of the Spanish Republic 
 
 
  (trade unionist)

Suggested listening 
 Songs of the Lincoln and International Brigades (Stinson Records) (1962)
 Songs of the Spanish Civil War Vol. 1 (Folkways) (1961)
 Songs of the Spanish Civil War Vol. 2: Songs of the Lincoln Brigade (Folkways) (1962)
 Spain in My Heart: Songs of the Spanish Civil War (Appleseed) (2003)

External links

Films, images and sounds

Films
 The Spanish Civil War. A six-part documentary miniseries using film and eyewitness accounts from both sides of the conflict.
 Tierra Española (The Spanish Earth) by Joris Ivens, 1937

Images
 Guernica by Pablo Picasso
 The Spanish Civil War by Robert Capa, Magnum Photos
 Aircraft of the Spanish Civil War
 Imperial War Museum Collection of Spanish Civil War Posters hosted online by Libcom.org
 Posters of the Spanish Civil War from UCSD's Southworth collection
 About the Spanish Civil War – Illinois English Department at the University of Illinois
 Collection: "Exiles from the Spanish Civil War" from the University of Michigan Museum of Art

Sounds
 Valley of Jarama – song by Woody Guthrie (see: Jarama)
 Anthems and songs 
 11 Songs of the Spanish Civil War 
 Spanish Bombs – song by The Clash
 Viva la Quinta Brigada – song by Christy Moore
 For Whom the Bell Tolls – song by Metallica

Miscellaneous documents 
 About the Spanish Civil War – Illinois English Department at the University of Illinois

Diverse references and citations 
 Spanish Civil War History Project at the University of South Florida
 ¡No Pasarán! Speech Dolores Ibárruri's famous rousing address for the defense of the Second Republic
 "Trabajadores: The Spanish Civil War through the eyes of organised labour", a digitised collection of more than 13,000 pages of documents from the archives of the British Trades Union Congress held in the Modern Records Centre, University of Warwick
 .
  A testimony by two surrealists and trotskytes
 
 
  with about a dozen essays written during and about the Spanish Civil War.
 
 
 
 , a detailed chronicle of the events of the war
 
 
 "The Spanish Civil War", BBC Radio 4 discussion with Paul Preston, Helen Graham and Mary Vincent (In Our Time, 3 April 2003)

Academics and governments 
 A History of the Spanish Civil War, excerpted from a U.S. government country study.
 "The Spanish Civil War – causes and legacy" on BBC Radio 4's In Our Time featuring Paul Preston, Helen Graham and Dr Mary Vincent (audio)
 Spanish Civil War information at Spartacus Educational
 Interview with Agustín Guillamón, historian of the Spanish Revolution
 The Anarcho-Statists of Spain (the anarchists in the Spanish Civil War), George Mason University
 Fanny, Queen of the Machine Gun (Dutch volunteers) at The Volunteer
 Jews In The Spanish Civil War – by Martin Sugarman, assistant archivist at the Jewish Military Museum
 Franco and the Spanish Civil War, paper by Filipe Ribeiro de Meneses, Routledge, London, 2001
 Full text in translation of the Collective Letter of the Spanish Bishops, 1937, a pastoral letter of the Spanish bishops which justified Franco's uprising
 New Zealand and the Spanish Civil War
 Warships of the Spanish Civil War

Archives 
 Robert E. Burke Collection.  1892–1994. 60.43 cubic feet (68 boxes plus two oversize folders and one oversize vertical file). At the Labor Archives of Washington, University of Washington Libraries Special Collections. Contains materials collected by Burke on the Spanish Civil War.
 Anarchy Archives
 The role of anarchism in the Spanish Revolution
 Private Collection about German Exile and Spanish Civil War
 The Archives of Ontario Remembers Children's Art from the Spanish Civil War, online exhibit on Archives of Ontario website
 Stuyvesant's Spanish Civil War Archives

 
Carlism
Civil wars involving the states and peoples of Europe
1930s conflicts
1930s in Spain
Francoist Spain
Modern history of Spain
Wars involving Spain
Revolution-based civil wars
Proxy wars